Hocine Gherzouli, (Arabic:حسين غيرذل) is a Paralympian athlete from Algeria competing mainly in category F40 shot put events.

He competed in the 2008 Summer Paralympics in Beijing, China. There he won a bronze medal in the men's F40 shot put event.

External links
 

Paralympic athletes of Algeria
Athletes (track and field) at the 2008 Summer Paralympics
Paralympic bronze medalists for Algeria
Living people
Medalists at the 2008 Summer Paralympics
Medalists at the 2012 Summer Paralympics
Athletes (track and field) at the 2012 Summer Paralympics
Paralympic silver medalists for Algeria
Year of birth missing (living people)
Paralympic medalists in athletics (track and field)
21st-century Algerian people
Algerian shot putters